Gymnopilus subflavidus is a species of mushroom in the family Hymenogastraceae.

See also

List of Gymnopilus species

External links
Gymnopilus subflavidus at Index Fungorum

subflavidus
Taxa named by William Alphonso Murrill